Semaphorin-4F is a protein that in humans is encoded by the SEMA4F gene.

References

Further reading